This is a timeline documenting events of Jazz in the year 1997.

Events

March
 21 – The 24th Vossajazz started in Voss, Norway (March 21 – 23).

May
 16 – The 26th Moers Festival started in Moers, Germany (May 16 – 19).
 21 – The 25th Nattjazz started in Bergen, Norway (May 21 – 31).

June
 26 – The 18th Montreal International Jazz Festival started in Montreal, Quebec, Canada (June 26 – July 6).

July
 2 – The 7th Jazz Fest Wien started in Wien, Austria (July 2 – 13).
 4 – The 31st Montreux Jazz Festival started in Montreux, Switzerland (July 4 – 19).
 11
 The 22nd North Sea Jazz Festival started in The Hague, Netherlands (July 11 – 13).
 The 50th Nice Jazz Festival started in France (July 11 – 20).
 12 – The 32nd Pori Jazz Festival started in Finland (July 12 – 20).
 15 – The 38th Moldejazz started in Molde, Norway (July 15 – 20).

August
 8 – The 14th Brecon Jazz Festival started in Brecon, Wales (August 8 – 10).

September
 19 – The 40th Monterey Jazz Festival started in Monterey, California (September 19 – 21).

October
 7 – Blue Note – A Story of Modern Jazz, by jazz documentarist and filmmaker Julian Benedikt, an award-winning documentary film.

Album releases

October

Unknown date

Guillermo Gregorio: Ellipsis
Matthew Shipp: Strata
Steve Coleman: Genesis
Marcus Roberts: Blues for the New Millennium
ICP Orchestra: Jubilee Varia
Vandermark 5: Single Piece Flow
David Liebman: Time Immemorial
Wynton Marsalis: Blood on the Fields
Franz Koglmann: O Moon My Pin Up
Courtney Pine: Underground
Leo Smith: Golden Hearts Remembrance
Keith Tippett: Colours Fulfilled
Joe Lovano: Trio Fascination
David Liebman: The Elements - Water
Fred Anderson: Fred Anderson / DKV Trio

Deaths

 January
 8 – George Handy, American arranger, composer, and pianist (born 1920).
 12 – Wally Rose, American pianist (born 1913).
 16 – Beverly Peer, American upright bassist (born 1912).
 25 – Seldon Powell, American tenor saxophonist and flautist (born 1928).

 February
 10 – Lou Bennett, American organist (born 1926).
 14 – Charles Moffett, American drummer (born 1929).
 20 – Zachary Breaux, American guitarist (born 1960).
 23 – Tony Williams, American drummer (born 1945).

 March
 11 – Hugh Lawson, American pianist (born 1935).

 May
 10 – Bernard Anderson, American trumpeter (born 1919).
 12 – Louis Barbarin, American drummer (born 1902).
 14 – Thelma Carpenter, American singer and actress (born 1922).
 15 – Tommy Turrentine, American trumpeter (born 1928).
 18 – Horst Lippmann, German drummer, concert promoter, writer, and television director (born 1927).
 31 – Eddie Jones, American upright bassist (born 1929).

 June
 2 – Doc Cheatham, American trumpeter, singer and bandleader (born 1905).
 4
 Anne Lenner, English singer (born 1912).
 Johnny "Hammond" Smith, American organist (born 1933).
 12 – Chuck Andrus, American upright bassist (born 1928).
 14 – Arthur Prysock, American singer (born 1924).
 16 – Rolf Ericson, Swedish trumpeter and flugelhornist (born 1922).
 19 – Thurman Green, American trombonist (born 1940).

 July
 2 – Stan Barker, American pianist (born 1926).
 29 – Chuck Wayne, American guitarist (born 1923).

 August
 2 – Fela Kuti, Nigerian saxophonist and multi-instrumentalist (born 1938).
 8
 Dardanelle Hadley, American singer, vibraphonist, pianist, composer, and arranger (born 1917).
 Duncan Swift, British pianist (born 1943).
 12 – Dick Marx, American pianist and arranger (born 1924).
 14 – Eric Von Essen, American bassist, pianist, and composer (born 1954).
 24 – Tete Montoliu, American pianist (born 1933).

 September
 18 – Jimmy Witherspoon, American singer (born 1920).
 20 – Dick Shearer, American trombonist (born 1940).

 October
 29 – Big Nick Nicholas, American saxophonist and vocalist (born 1922).

 November
 2 – Carson Smith, American upright bassist (born 1931).
 9 – Joe Roccisano, saxophonist and arranger (born 1939).
 10 – Tommy Tedesco, American guitarist (born 1930).
 11 – Shake Keane, American trumpeter and poet (born 1927).
 12 – Carola Standertskjöld, Finnish singer (born 1941).

 December
 1 – Stéphane Grappelli, French violinist (born 1908).
 6 – George Chisholm, American trombonist (born 1915).
 12 – Mouse Randolph, American trumpeter (born 1909).
 21 – Johnny Coles, American trumpeter (born 1926).
 30 – Ray Crawford, American guitarist (born 1924).

 Unknown date
 Johnny Mince, American clarinetist (born 1912).

Births

 Unknown date
 Barbra Lica, Canadian jazz singer and songwriter.

See also

 1990s in jazz
 List of years in jazz
 1997 in music

References

External links 
 History Of Jazz Timeline: 1997 at All About Jazz

  
 

Jazz
Jazz by year